The Santa Rosa Band of Cahuilla Indians is a federally recognized tribe of Cahuilla Indians, located in Riverside County, California.

Reservation
The Santa Rosa Indian Reservation, not to be confused with the Santa Rosa Rancheria, is a reservation in Riverside County in the Santa Rosa Mountains, near the town of Anza. It is  acres large. It was established in 1907.

Government
The tribe's headquarters is located on the Santa Rosa Indian Reservation. Lovina Redner is their current tribal chairperson.

History
The federal government closely supervised Cahuilla after 1891. Government schools were opened for Cahuilla children and Protestant missionaries moved onto their reservation. During the 20th century, the tribe supported itself through cattle grazing and wage labor. Many members of the Santa Rosa band do not live on the reservation. In 1970, only 7 out of 61 enrolled tribal members lived on the reservation. Education and economic diversity has improved for the tribes since the 1970s.

See also
Mission Indians

Notes

References
 Bean, Lowell John. "Cahuilla." Heizer, Robert F., volume ed. Handbook of North American Indians: California, Volume 8. Washington, DC: Smithsonian Institution, 1978. .
 Eargle, Jr., Dolan H. California Indian Country: The Land and the People. San Francisco: Tree Company Press, 1992. .
 Pritzker, Barry M. A Native American Encyclopedia: History, Culture, and Peoples. Oxford: Oxford University Press, 2000. .

Further reading

External links
 Home page Santa Rosa Band
 

Cahuilla
California Mission Indians
Native American tribes in California
Federally recognized tribes in the United States
Native American tribes in Riverside County, California